A rag-and-bone man or ragpicker (UK English) or ragman, old-clothesman, junkman, or junk dealer (US English), also called a bone-grubber, bone-picker, chiffonnier, rag-gatherer, bag board, or  totter, collects unwanted household items and sells them to merchants. Scraps of cloth and paper could be turned into cardboard, while broken glass could be melted down and reused, and even dead cats and dogs could be skinned to make clothes. Traditionally, this was a task performed on foot, with the scavenged materials (which included rags, bones and various metals) kept in a small bag slung over the shoulder. Some rag-and-bone men used a cart, sometimes pulled by a horse or pony.

In the 19th century, rag-and-bone men typically lived in extreme poverty, surviving on the proceeds of what they collected each day. Conditions for rag-and-bone men in general improved following the Second World War, but the trade declined during the latter half of the 20th century. However, in more recent years, partly as the result of the soaring price of scrap metal, rag-and-bone-style collection continues, particularly in the developing world.

19th century

In the UK, 19th-century rag-and-bone men scavenged unwanted rags, bones, metal and other waste from the towns and cities in which they lived. Henry Mayhew's 1851 report London Labour and the London Poor estimates that in London, between 800 and 1,000 "bone-grubbers and rag-gatherers" lived in lodging houses, garrets and "ill-furnished rooms in the lowest neighbourhoods."

These bone-grubbers, as they were sometimes known, would typically spend nine or ten hours searching the streets of London for anything of value, before returning to their lodgings to sort whatever they had found. In rural areas where no rag merchants were present, rag-and-bone men often dealt directly with rag paper makers, but in London they sold rag to the local traders. White rag could fetch two to three pence per pound, depending on condition (all rag had to be dry before it could be sold). Coloured rag was worth about two pence per pound. Bones, worth about the same, could be used as knife handles, toys and ornaments, and, when treated, for chemistry. The grease extracted from them was also useful for soapmaking. Metal was more valuable; an 1836 edition of Chambers's Edinburgh Journal describes how "street-grubber[s]" could be seen scraping away the dirt between the paving stones of non-macadamised roads, searching for horseshoe nails. Brass, copper and pewter were valued at about four to five pence per pound. In a typical day, a rag-and-bone man might expect to earn about sixpence.

Mayhew's report indicates that many who worked as rag-and-bone men did so after falling on hard times, and generally lived in squalor. Although they usually started work well before dawn, they were not immune to the public's ire; in 1872, several rag-and-bone men in Westminster caused complaint when they emptied the contents of two dust trucks to search for rags, bones and paper, blocking people's path.

The ragpickers (rag and bone man) in the 19th and early 20th century did not recycle the materials themselves. They would simply collect whatever they could find and turn it over to a "master ragpicker" (usually a former ragpicker) who would, in turn, sell it—generally by weight—to wealthy investors with the means to convert the materials into something more profitable.

In the West Riding of Yorkshire, rag and bone men would collect waste woollen and rag products from householders to sell on to the Shoddy factories. 'Shoddy', cloth made from recycled wool, was first manufactured (and probably invented) by Benjamin Law in Batley, West Yorkshire, in 1813. The process involved grinding woollen rags into a fibrous mass and mixing this with some fresh wool. Law’s nephews later came up with a similar process involving felt or hard-spun woollen cloth, the product in this case being called ‘mungo’. Samuel Parr was the first producer of mungo in 1834. He used old coats and trousers, tailors clippings, ground up to produce shorter fibres than shoddy. In the shoddy preparation process, the rags were sorted, and any seams, or parts of the rag not suitable, were left to rot and then sold onto to farmers to manure crops. Or they were used for bedding or stuffing. The remaining wool rags were then sent to the shoddy mills for processing. For several decades shipments of rags even arrived from continental Europe. Shoddy and mungo manufacture was, by the 1860s, a huge industry in West Yorkshire, particularly in and around the Batley, Dewsbury and Ossett areas. 

Although it was solely a job for the lowest of the working classes, ragpicking was considered an honest occupation, more on the level of street sweeper than of a beggar. In Paris, ragpickers were regulated by law and could operate only at night. They were required to return unusually valuable items either to the items' owners or to the authorities. When Eugène Poubelle introduced the rubbish bin in 1884, he was criticised by French newspapers for meddling with the ragpickers' livelihood.

20th century

A 1954 report in The Manchester Guardian mentioned that some men could make as much as £25 a day collecting rags. Most used handcarts rather than a bag, and some used a pony and cart, giving out rubbing stones in exchange for the items that they collected. In 1958, a Manchester Guardian reporter accompanied rag-and-bone man John Bibby as he made his rounds through Chorlton and Stretford, near Manchester. For his handcart's load, which comprised rags, furs, shoes, scrap car parts, a settee and other furniture, Bibby made about £2.
Shoddy and Mungo manufacture in West Yorkshire continued into the 1950s and the rag man would set up his cart in local streets and weigh the wool or rags brought by the women whom they then paid. 
By the mid-1960s the rag-and-bone trade as a whole had fallen into decline; in the 1950s, Manchester and Salford had, between them, around 60 rag merchants, but this had dropped to about 12 by 1978, many having moved into the scrap-metal trade. Local merchants blamed several factors, including demographic changes, for the decline of their industry.  

A 1965 newspaper report estimated that in London, only a "few hundred" rag-and-bone men remained, possibly because of competition from more specialised trades, such as corporation dustmen, and pressure from property developers to build on rag merchants' premises.  

In the 1980s, Hollywood star Kirk Douglas mentioned in an interview with Johnny Carson that his father was a ragman in New York and "young people nowadays don't know what is ragman." 

Although BBC's popular 1960s/70s television comedy Steptoe and Son helped to maintain the rag-and-bone man's status in British folklore, by the 1980s they were mostly gone. In more recent years, rising scrap metal prices have prompted their return, although most drive vans rather than horses and carts, and they announce their presence by megaphone, causing some members of the public to complain about the noise they create.

21st century
Ragpicking is still widespread in Third World countries, such as in Mumbai, India, where it offers the poorest in society around the rubbish and recycling areas a chance to earn a hand-to-mouth supply of money. In 2015, the Environment Minister of India declared a national award to recognise the service rendered by ragpickers. The award, with a cash prize of Rs. 1.5 lakh, is for three best rag pickers and three associations involved in innovation of best practices.

Ragpicking has a positive impact on urban spaces with a weak waste management infrastructure. In India, the economic activity of ragpicking is worth about ₹3200 crore. India was also found to have a near-90% recycle rate for PET bottles, which could probably be attributed to ragpicking, given a lack of solid-waste management and under-developed waste collection and recycling culture in that country.

Cultural impact
Charles Baudelaire's Les Fleurs du Mal (1888) includes a poem where the ragpicker character has a prominent role, entitled "Le Vin de chiffonniers" ("The Rag-Picker's Wine").
Francis Saltus Saltus' Shadows and Ideals (1890) includes a poem about ragpickers entitled "The Old Rag-picker of Paris".
Bram Stoker's short story, The Burial of the Rats (1896) is set amongst the chiffoniers of the Montrouge district of Paris in 1850.
A section of tenement buildings near Chatham Square, Manhattan became known as Rag-picker's Court, as this was the profession of most of its residents. In 1879, William Allen Rogers drew the rag-strewn courtyard for Harper's Weekly as part of a series of engravings focused on inner-city life.
In the 1862 novel Les Misérables, the character Vargouleme is a ragpicker. He considers himself fortunate because, unlike many on the streets of Paris, he has a profession.
 "Original Rags" is an 1899 musical medley for piano, an early example of the Ragtime genre, that makes reference to rag picking, as well as a pun
 "Rag and Bone" is a song by the American garage rock band The White Stripes, told from the point of view of two rag and bone collectors.
 The Ragpicker's Dream is a song and album by songwriter/guitarist Mark Knopfler released in 2002.
Picking Rags is a song by singer/musician George "Mojo" Buford from his 1998 album State Of The Blues Harp.
A segment from the 1967 CBS News Special Report television broadcast The Tenement portrays the work of a local rag picker in Chicago.

See also
 Glossary of textile manufacturing
 Junk man
 Karung guni, a counterpart similar to a rag-and-bone man in Singapore.
 Waste collector
 Zabbaleen, a group of people in Egypt who operate in a similar manner

References
Footnotes

Notes

Bibliography

Further reading

For a description of 19th-century French ragmen, or chiffonniers, see

External links

The end of the road for the rag-and-bone man, at independent.co.uk

Cleaning and maintenance occupations
Informal occupations
Waste collection